Hugh 'Vaughan' O Thomas (12 June 1964 – December 2022) was a male British rowing coxswain. Thomas competed in the men's coxed four event at the 1988 Summer Olympics.

Despite being Welsh born he represented England and won a silver medal in the eight, at the 1986 Commonwealth Games in Edinburgh, Scotland.

References

External links
 

1964 births
2022 deaths
British male rowers
Olympic rowers of Great Britain
Rowers at the 1988 Summer Olympics
Sportspeople from Bangor, Gwynedd
Coxswains (rowing)
Commonwealth Games medallists in rowing
Commonwealth Games silver medallists for England
Rowers at the 1986 Commonwealth Games
Medallists at the 1986 Commonwealth Games